Oumaïma Belahbib (born 21 August 1996), also known as Oumayma Belahbib or Oumayma Bel Ahbib, is a Moroccan amateur boxer, who won a gold medal at the 2017 African Amateur Boxing Championships, and a bronze medal at the 2019 African Games. She has competed in the welterweight (under 69 kg) event at the delayed 2020 Summer Olympics.

Career

At the 2017 African Amateur Boxing Championships in Brazzaville, Congo, Belahbib won the under-64 kg event. It was Morocco's first women's gold medal at the African Amateur Boxing Championships, and their only gold medal of the 2017 Championships. She won a bronze medal in the under-69 kg event at the 2019 African Games. Later in the year, she competed at the 2019 AIBA Women's World Boxing Championships, losing in the round of 16 to India's Lovlina Borgohain. 

In January 2020, she won a bronze medal at the Nations Cup International Boxing Tournament, and in February 2020, Belahbib won her 2020 African Boxing Olympic Qualification Tournament under-69 kg event. As a result, she qualified for the welterweight (under 69 kg) event at the delayed 2020 Summer Olympics. Her place at the Games was assured after winning her semi-final against Kenyan Elizabeth Akinyi. In 2021, she won another bronze medal at the Nations Cup International Boxing Tournament. At the 2020 Olympics, Belahbib lost her round of 16 match to Ukrainian Anna Lysenko.

At the 2022 Mediterranean Games, Belahbib reached the semi-finals of the under-66kg event before withdrawing from the competition. As a result, she won a bronze medal.

References

External links

 
 
 
 

1996 births
Living people
Moroccan women boxers
Competitors at the 2019 African Games
African Games medalists in boxing
African Games bronze medalists for Morocco
Boxers at the 2020 Summer Olympics
Olympic boxers of Morocco
Competitors at the 2022 Mediterranean Games
Mediterranean Games bronze medalists for Morocco
Mediterranean Games medalists in boxing
21st-century Moroccan women